

196001–196100 

|-id=005
| 196005 Róbertschiller ||  || Róbert Schiller (born 1935), Hungarian physical chemist || 
|-id=035
| 196035 Haraldbill ||  || Harald Bill (born 1964), a long-term friend of the discoverer, is a German amateur astronomer || 
|}

196101–196200 

|-bgcolor=#f2f2f2
| colspan=4 align=center | 
|}

196201–196300 

|-bgcolor=#f2f2f2
| colspan=4 align=center | 
|}

196301–196400 

|-bgcolor=#f2f2f2
| colspan=4 align=center | 
|}

196401–196500 

|-id=411
| 196411 Umurhan ||  || Orkan Umurhan (born 1969), a scientist at the SETI Institute, who worked for the New Horizons mission to Pluto as a science team post-doctoral researcher for geophysics investigations || 
|-id=476
| 196476 Humfernandez ||  || Humberto Fernández-Morán (1924–1999), Venezuelan research scientist who developed the diamond knife. He created the Venezuelan Institute for Neurological and Brain Studies which is now known as the Venezuelan Institute of Scientific Research. || 
|-id=481
| 196481 VATT ||  || The Vatican Advanced Technology Telescope (VATT) || 
|}

196501–196600 

|-id=540
| 196540 Weinbaum ||  || Stanley G. Weinbaum (1902–1935), American science-fiction author || 
|}

196601–196700 

|-id=640
| 196640 Mulhacén ||  || Mulhacén, the highest mountain of the Iberian Peninsula || 
|}

196701–196800 

|-id=736
| 196736 Munkácsy ||  || Mihály Munkácsy (1844–1900), a Hungarian painter who lived in Paris and gained an international reputation with his genre pictures and large-scale biblical paintings. || 
|-id=772
| 196772 Fritzleiber ||  || Fritz Leiber (1910–1992), American science-fiction writer || 
|}

196801–196900 

|-id=807
| 196807 Beshore ||  || Ed Beshore (born 1954), American operations manager and lead software engineer for the near-Earth object search programs at the Catalina, Siding Spring and Mount Lemmon surveys. He has discovered several comets including 297P/Beshore. || 
|}

196901–197000 

|-id=938
| 196938 Delgordon ||  || Del Gordon (born 1958), American software/systems engineer for Unmanned Aerial Vehicles at Northrop Grumman Corporation and an officer of the Huachuca Astronomy Club || 
|-id=945
| 196945 Guerin ||  || Georges Guerin (born 1934) is a retired philosophy professor. He is passionate about astronomy and has built his own observatory at La Ratonie in the Aveyron region of France. || 
|}

References 

196001-197000